Pittosporum rhytidocarpum is a species of plant in the Pittosporaceae family. It is endemic to Fiji.

References

Endemic flora of Fiji
rhytidocarpum
Least concern plants
Taxonomy articles created by Polbot